Margaret 'Peggy' McLean (married name Folke), (born July 8, 1927) is a former international table tennis player from the United States.

Table tennis career
She has won two World Championship medals including a gold medal in the women's team event at the 1949 World Table Tennis Championships. 

In addition she won a mixed doubles bronze medal with Marty Reisman in 1949. She also won two English Open titles.

Hall of Fame
She was inducted into the USA Hall of Fame in 1980.

See also
 List of table tennis players
 List of World Table Tennis Championships medalists

References

American female table tennis players
Possibly living people
1927 births
20th-century American women